Runavík Municipality is a municipality of the Faroe Islands. The town of Saltangará is the administrative centre.

Its area comprises parts of the island of Eysturoy.

It contains the following towns and villages:

On Eysturoy:
Runavík
Elduvík
Funningsfjørður
Funningur
Glyvrar
Lambareiði
Lamba
Oyndarfjørður
Rituvík
Saltangará
Skálabotnur
Skála
Skipanes
Søldarfjørður
Æðuvík

References

Municipalities of the Faroe Islands